Syed Mahboob Ali Shah (born 13 October 1938) is a former Pakistani first-class cricketer and Test cricket umpire.

Mahboob Shah was born in Delhi.  Before becoming an umpire, he played in 14 first-class matches for Baluchistan, Central Zone, Karachi Whites, Karachi C, Quetta and Karachi University between 1954/55 and 1960/61.  He reached the Final of the Quaid-e-Azam Trophy in 1957/58 with Karachi C, losing to Bahawalpur.  He achieved a batting average of 21.10 in 21 innings, including a high score of 152, his only first-class century, for Karachi University against Sind University in February 1960; as a medium-fast bowler, he took 12 wickets at a bowling average of 22.58, including 6/14 for Karachi C against Sind A in October 1957.

He umpired 28 Test matches and 32 ODIs between March 1975 and March 1997, mainly in Pakistan – only four of his Test matches were overseas.   He made his Test umpiring debut in March 1975, in the second Test between Pakistan and West Indies at the National Stadium, Karachi.  He stood regularly in Test matches in Pakistan from 1978 to 1990.  In 1994, he and Khizer Hayat were the two Pakistani representatives on the first international panel of umpires, set up by the ICC to ensure that one neutral umpire would stand in every Test match (later supplemented by the Elite Panel of ICC Umpires). He stood in his first Test outside Pakistan in March 1994, in the third Test between South Africa and Australia at Kingsmead, Durban.  His final Test was the second Test between New Zealand and Sri Lanka at Trust Bank Park (aka Seddon Park), Hamilton, in March 1997.

He made his ODI debut as umpire in the match between Pakistan and New Zealand at Jinnah Stadium, Sialkot on 16 October 1976.  He umpired in the 1987 Cricket World Cup in India, including the final between Australia and England at Eden Gardens, Calcutta, on 8 November 1987, and in the 1996 Cricket World Cup in Sri Lanka and Pakistan.  His last ODI was the third between Pakistan and New Zealand at the National Stadium, Karachi, on 8 December 1996.

See also
 List of Test cricket umpires
 List of One Day International cricket umpires

References

External links
List of matches from CricketArchive
Profile from Cricinfo

1938 births
Living people
Muhajir people
Pakistani Test cricket umpires
Pakistani One Day International cricket umpires
Pakistani cricketers
Cricketers from Delhi
Baluchistan cricketers
Karachi Whites cricketers
Karachi C cricketers
Quetta cricketers
Karachi University cricketers
Central Zone (Pakistan) cricketers